Hannah Rae (born July 18, 1997) is an English actress. She came to prominence in her 2016 feature film debut City of Tiny Lights, for which she was nominated for the Most Promising Newcomer Award at the British Independent Film Awards.

Filmography

Film

Television

Stage

References

External links 
 
 Hannah Rae on Spotlight
 Hannah Rae, CV on Curtis Brown Literary and Talent Agency

English film actresses
English television actresses
Living people
21st-century English actresses
Alumni of British Youth Music Theatre
1997 births